Meresankh is the name of several royal women from the Old Kingdom in Ancient Egypt. It means "she loves life" and was popular during the 4th dynasty.
Meresankh, wife of Raherka
Meresankh I, mother of the 4th dynasty King Sneferu
Meresankh, daughter of Prince Kanefer, son of Sneferu 
Meresankh II, daughter of Khufu and Meritites I, married to her half-brother Horbaef, later wife of Djedefre or Khafre
Meresankh III, daughter of Hetepheres II and Kawab, married to Pharaoh Khafre 
 Meresankh IV, queen of Egypt towards the end of the 5th dynasty

Ancient Egyptian given names
Egyptian feminine given names